Been is a surname. Notable people with the surname include:

Dick Been (1914–1978), Dutch footballer
Dirk Been, American reality show contestant
Harry Been (born 1949), Dutch football official 
Mario Been (born 1963), Dutch footballer and manager
Michael Been (1950–2010), American musician
Robert Levon Been (born 1978), American musician
Saneita Been (born 1986), Turks and Caicos Islands beauty pageant winner